Psilopleura vittata is a moth in the subfamily Arctiinae. It was described by Francis Walker in 1865. It is found in Mexico, Guatemala and Belize.

References

Moths described in 1865
Euchromiina